The Chapelton Formation is a geologic formation in Jamaica. It preserves fossils dating back to the Paleogene period, Eocene epoch. Fossils of the possible species Charactosuchus kugleri have been found in the formation.

See also 

 List of fossiliferous stratigraphic units in Jamaica

References

External links 
 

Geologic formations of Jamaica
Paleogene Caribbean
Paleontology in Jamaica